Twin Pinnacles is a rock  high marked by two summits, lying  northeast of Lions Rump at the west side of the entrance to King George Bay in the South Shetland Islands. Charted and named during 1937 by DI personnel on the Discovery II.

Rock formations of the South Shetland Islands